The square-tailed saw-wing (Psalidoprocne nitens), also known as the square-tailed rough-winged swallow is a species of bird in the family Hirundinidae.
It is found in Angola, Cameroon, Central African Republic, Republic of the Congo, Democratic Republic of the Congo, Ivory Coast, Equatorial Guinea, Gabon, Ghana, Guinea, Liberia, Nigeria, and Sierra Leone.

Subspecies
There are currently two recognised subspecies.
P. n. nitens, the nominate subspecies, which occurs in Guinea, Sierra Leone, Ivory Coast, Ghana, Togo, Nigeria, Gabon, Congo and Angola.  
P. n. centralis, which occurs in northeast Democratic Republic of the Congo.

References

square-tailed saw-wing
Birds of Central Africa
Birds of West Africa
square-tailed saw-wing
Taxonomy articles created by Polbot